This is a list of diplomatic missions in Cape Verde.  At present, the capital city of Praia hosts 15 embassies.

Embassies 
Praia

Missions 
  (Delegation)

Gallery

Consulates / Consular offices 
Mindelo
  (Consular office)

Non-resident embassies 
Resident in Dakar

 
 
 
 
 
 
 
 
 
 
 
 
 
 
 
 
 
 
 
 
 
 
 
 
 
 
   
 
  
 
 
 
 
 

Resident in Lisbon

 
 
 
 
 
 
 
 
 
   
 
 
 
 
 
 

Resident elsewhere

  (Paris)
  (Accra)
  (Paris)
  (Paris)
  (London)
  (New York City)
  (Luanda)
  (Bissau)
  (New York City)
  (Paris)
  (Abuja)
  (Brussels)
  (Luanda)

References

External links 
 Ministry of Foreign Affairs of the Republic of Cape Verde (in Portuguese)
US Department of State Background Notes on Cape Verde

Foreign relations of Cape Verde
Cape Verde
Diplomatic missions